John Jonas "Doc" Kerr (January 17, 1882 – January 9, 1937) was a Major League Baseball player who played for the Pittsburgh Rebels and the Baltimore Terrapins in  and .

External links

1882 births
1937 deaths
Major League Baseball catchers
Pittsburgh Rebels players
Baltimore Terrapins players
Baseball players from Ohio
Holyoke Papermakers players
New Britain Perfectos players
Albany Senators players
Trenton Tigers players
Atlanta Crackers players
Wilmington Chicks players
Richmond Virginians (minor league) players